Bokoro Airport  is a public use airport located near Bokoro, Hadjer-Lamis, Chad.

See also
List of airports in Chad

References

External links 
 Airport record for Bokoro Airport at Landings.com

Airports in Chad
Hadjer-Lamis Region